Rīgas apriņķis was a historic county of the Duchy of Livonia, the Governorate of Livonia, and the Republic of Latvia dissolved during the administrative territorial reform of the Latvian SSR in 1949.

History 
After the Treaty of Drohiczyn Riga merged into the Wenden Voivodeship of the Polish–Lithuanian Commonwealth in 1582. The County of Riga was founded in 1629 as a subdivision of Swedish Vidzeme. After the incorporation of Livonia by the Russian Empire in 1721, it became one of the nine subdivisions of the Governorate of Livonia. Its capital was Riga, which was the capital of the governorate as well. 

After establishment of the Republic of Latvia in 1918, the Rīgas apriņķis existed until 1949, when the Council of Ministers of the Latvian SSR split it into the newly created districts (rajons) of Riga, Baldone (dissolved in 1959), Saulkrasti (dissolved in 1956) and Sigulda (dissolved in 1962).

Demographics
At the time of the Russian Empire Census of 1897, County of Riga (Kreis Riga) had a population of 396,101. Of these, 58.2% spoke Latvian, 18.2% German, 11.9% Russian, 4.7% Yiddish, 3.5% Polish, 1.6% Lithuanian, 1.1% Estonian, 0.2% Belarusian, 0.1% Tatar, 0.1% Ukrainian, 0.1% English and 0.1% French as their native language.

References

  
Uezds of the Governorate of Livonia